Bad Boy's 10th Anniversary...The Hits is a 2004 compilation album by Bad Boy Records. The only single released was "Victory 2004", a remix of P. Diddy's "Victory" off No Way Out. Victory 2004 featured The Notorious B.I.G. (his 2 verses from the original Victory), Busta Rhymes, 50 Cent & Lloyd Banks. For reasons unknown, the censored versions of "Hypnotize" and "Mo Money Mo Problems" appear on the uncensored version of the album.

Track listing

Charts

Weekly charts

Year-end charts

References

2004 compilation albums
Bad Boy Records compilation albums
Hip hop compilation albums
Record label compilation albums